Shane Wright (born 13 March 1996) is an Australian professional rugby league footballer who plays as a  forward for the Salford Red Devils in the Super League.

Background
Wright was born in Perth, Western Australia. He played his junior rugby league for the Proserpine Whitsunday Brahmans before being signed by the Manly Warringah Sea Eagles at the age of 14. Wright then moved to the Gold Coast, Queensland, attending Palm Beach Currumbin State High School and playing junior rugby league for the Burleigh Bears before being signed by the Gold Coast Titans.

Playing career

Early career
In 2015 and 2016, Wright played for the Gold Coast Titans' NYC team. In November 2016, he signed a two-year contract with the North Queensland Cowboys starting in 2017.

2017
In round 24 of the 2017 NRL season, Wright made his NRL debut for the North Queensland Cowboys against the Cronulla-Sutherland Sharks.

2018
On April 17, Wright re-signed with the North Queensland club until the end of the 2020 NRL season. He spent the majority of the 2018 season playing for the Mackay Cutters, registering just two NRL games for the North Queensland side, which included a start at second row in their Round 18 loss to the Canberra Raiders.

2019
After starting the season playing for the Mackay Cutters, Wright earned an NRL call-up in Round 11, coming off the bench in a 22–16 win over the Canberra Raiders. By Round 15, Wright had forced his way into the starting line up at second row, where he would remain for the rest of the season. In Round 21, he scored his first NRL try in a 14–18 loss to the Brisbane Broncos. In Round 24, Wright scored the final try at Willows Sports Complex in a 15–8 win over the Canterbury-Bankstown Bulldogs. On 18 September, he was named the Cowboys' 2019 Rookie of the Year at the club's presentation night.

2020
In February, Wright was a member of the North Queensland club's 2020 NRL Nines winning squad. On 3 June, he re-signed with the North Queensland outfit until the end of the 2021 NRL season.

Salford Red Devils
On 16 Oct 2021 it was reported that he had signed for Salford Red Devils in the Super League

Achievements and accolades

Individual
North Queensland Cowboys Rookie of the Year: 2019

Team
2020 NRL Nines: North Queensland Cowboys – Winners

Statistics

NRL
 Statistics are correct to the end of the 2020 season

References

External links
North Queensland Cowboys profile
NRL profile

1996 births
Living people
Australian people of American descent
Australian expatriate sportspeople in England
Australian rugby league players
Burleigh Bears players
Mackay Cutters players
North Queensland Cowboys players
Rugby league players from Perth, Western Australia
Rugby league second-rows
Salford Red Devils players